Nikitinia is a genus of flowering plants in the family Asteraceae.

There is only one known species, Nikitinia leptoclada, native to Iran and Turkmenistan.

References

Flora of Asia
Monotypic Asteraceae genera
Cynareae